Satin Doll is an album by organist Shirley Scott recorded in 1961 and released on the Prestige label in 1963. It was Scott's second album of Duke Ellington compositions after Scottie Plays the Duke (1959).

Reception
The Allmusic review stated "A bit more prim, though Scott still burns".

Track listing 
 "Satin Doll" (Duke Ellington, Johnny Mercer, Billy Strayhorn)   
 "It Don't Mean a Thing (If It Ain't Got That Swing)" (Ellington, Irving Mills)  
 "C Jam Blues" (Barney Bigard, Ellington)   
 "Perdido" (Juan Tizol)   
 "Mood Indigo" (Bigard, Ellington, Mills)   
 "Things Ain't What They Used to Be" (Mercer Ellington, Ted Persons)   
 "Solitude"  (Eddie DeLange, Ellington, Mills)

Personnel 
 Shirley Scott - organ
 George Tucker - bass
 Mack Simpkins - drums

References 

1963 albums
Albums produced by Esmond Edwards
Albums recorded at Van Gelder Studio
Prestige Records albums
Shirley Scott albums
Duke Ellington tribute albums